Pseudosimochromis is a genus of fish in the cichlid family, endemic to the Lake Tanganyika basin in Africa.

Species
The species in Pseudosimochromis were formerly included in Simochromis. The limits between the individual species is in need of a review. As presently defined, following are recognized in the Pseudosimochromis:

 Pseudosimochromis babaulti (Pellegrin, 1927)
 Pseudosimochromis curvifrons (Poll, 1942)
 Pseudosimochromis margaretae (Axelrod & Harrison, 1978)
 Pseudosimochromis marginatus  (Poll, 1956)
 Pseudosimochromis pleurospilus Nelissen, 1978 — likely a synonym of P. babaulti.

References

 
Tropheini
Taxa named by Mark H. J. Nelissen
Taxonomy articles created by Polbot